Chapter Four: Alive in New York is a live album by Argentinian saxophonist and composer Gato Barbieri featuring released on the Impulse! label.

Reception
The Allmusic review by Thom Jurek awarded the album 4 stars stating "Chapter 4: Alive in New York is one of Barbieri's finest moments on record". The Penguin Guide to Jazz Recordings gives the album a “crown” in addition to a maximum four-star rating, calling it “a classic, iconic album of the ‘70s”.

Track listing
All compositions by Gato Barbieri except as indicated
 "Milonga Triste" (Homero Manzi, Sebastian Piana) - 6:30 
 "La China Leoncia Part 1" - 3:24 
 "La China Leoncia Part 2" - 4:09 
 "La China Leoncia Part 3" - 3:57 
 "La China Leoncia Pt. 4" - 4:16 
 "Baihia" (Isla de Demendes) - 10:50 
 "Lluvia Azul" - 9:55 
Recorded at the Bottom Line in New York City on February 20–23, 1975

Personnel
Gato Barbieri - tenor saxophone, guiro
Howard Johnson - tuba, flugelhorn, bass clarinet, tambourine
Eddie Martinez - electric piano
Paul Metzke - guitar
Ron Carter - bass
Portinho - drums
Ray Armando - conga, percussion

References

Impulse! Records live albums
Gato Barbieri live albums
1975 live albums